Blaster may refer to:

Arts and entertainment

Fictional entities
 Blaster (Star Wars), a gun
 Blaster (Transformers), an autobot 
 Blaster (G.I. Joe), a character 
 Blaster (Gobots), a Guardian Gobot
 Blaster, a character in 2009 film G-Force
 Blasters (comics), a DC Comics team of superhumans 
 Raygun, or blaster, a science-fiction directed-energy weapon

Music
 Blaster (Scott Weiland album), 2015
 "Blaster" (song), a 2003 song by Flow
 The Blasters, an American rock and roll band
 The Blasters (album), 1982

Other uses in arts and entertainment
 Blaster (video game), a 1983 arcade game
 "Blasters", an episode of Law & Order: Criminal Intent (season 6)

Computing
 Blaster (computer worm), prevalent in 2003
 Blaster Learning System, an educational software series 
 Sound Blaster, a family of sound cards by Creative Technology

People
 Blaster Al Ackerman (William Hogg Greathouse, Jr. 1939–2013), American mail artist and writer
 Blaster Bates (1923–2006), English explosives and demolition expert and comedian
 Hy Buller (1926–1968), nicknamed Blueline Blaster, Canadian ice hockey player

Toys
 Gel blaster, a toy gun that shoots water gel beads
 Nerf Blaster, a toy gun that shoots foam projectiles 
 Water blaster, a toy gun that shoots jets of water

Other uses
 Blaster (flamethrower), a South African anti-carjacking device
 Aerodyne Blaster, a series of French single-place paragliders 
 Kerala Blasters FC, an Indian professional football club commonly referred to as The Blasters
 PCB Blasters, a Pakistani women's cricket team

See also
 
 
 Blast (disambiguation)
 Blaster Master (disambiguation)
 Blasters (disambiguation)
 Blasting (disambiguation)
 Ghettoblaster (disambiguation)
 Abrasive blasting